The Tischbein family was a German family of artists, originating in Hesse and spanning three generations. The family patriarch, Johann Heinrich Tischbein (1682–1764), was a master baker at the State Hospital in Haina. The Tischbeins also produced a number of master carpenters. (The name translates as "Table Leg").

Notable members include:
Anton Wilhelm Tischbein (1730–1804), painter (the Hanauer Tischbein)
August Albrecht Christian Tischbein (1768–1848), painter and lithographer
August Anton Tischbein (1805 – after 1867), painter
Carl Wilhelm Tischbein (1797–1855), painter
Christian Wilhelm Tischbein (1751–1824), painter, architect and gallery director
Georg Heinrich Tischbein (1753–1848), etcher, engraver and cartographer 
Johann Anton Tischbein (1720–1784), painter
Johann Friedrich August Tischbein (1750–1812), painter (the Leipziger Tischbein)
Johann Heinrich Tischbein (1722–1789), painter (the Kasseler Tischbein)
Johann Heinrich Tischbein the Younger (1742–1808), painter and engraver 
Johann Heinrich Wilhelm Tischbein (1751–1828), painter (the Goethe Tischbein) 
Johann Jacob Tischbein (1725–1791), painter (the Lübecker Tischbein)
Johann Valentin Tischbein (1715–1768), painter and set designer
Ludwig Philipp Tischbein (1744–1806), architect and set designer
Paul Tischbein (1820–1874), painter

For a complete family tree, see the corresponding article in German Wikipedia.

Further reading
 Die hessische Malerfamilie Tischbein. Verzeichnis ihrer Mitglieder und eine Auswahl ihrer Werke. Staatliche Kunstsammlungen, Hessisches Landesmuseum, Kassel 1934
 3 x Tischbein und die europäische Malerei um 1800. Exhibition catalog (State Museum of Kassel, 2005. Museum der bildenden Künste, Leipzig, 2006). Edited by Michael Eissenhauer and Hans W. Schmidt. Hirmer, 2005

External links

 (includes biographies of several Tischbeins)

 
Artist families
18th-century German painters
19th-century German painters